Rožná is a municipality and village in Žďár nad Sázavou District in the Vysočina Region of the Czech Republic. It has about 800 inhabitants.

Administrative parts
Villages of Josefov and Zlatkov are administrative parts of Rožná.

References

Villages in Žďár nad Sázavou District